The I.S.T. L-17 Masang was a two-seat, single engine, low wing monoplane aircraft designed and built in the Philippine Republic in the mid-1950s.  It was intended for both touring and training.

Design and development

In the mid-1950s the Philippine Institute of Science and Technology (I.S.T.) designed aircraft to explore the possibilities of local aircraft production from indigenous materials.  The single engine, tricycle undercarriage, low wing monoplane L-17 was one of them.

Its wing was a single-piece wooden structure with 5° of dihedral  and a straight-tapered plan.  It was plywood-covered and had split flaps inboard of the ailerons.  The cantilever tail unit was similarly constructed with the straight-tapered horizontal surfaces on top of the extreme aft fuselage; the single-piece elevator carried an offset trim tab. The vertical tail was tall and straight-edged; the bottom of the horn balanced rudder was above the elevator and just aft of its hinge, with a small cut-out to allow for elevator deflection.

The L-17's fuselage was a plywood-skinned wooden semi-monocoque, the cockpit seating two side by side under a single piece canopy.  A 108 hp (80 kW) Lycoming O-235 flat-four engine drove a two-blade propeller.  The fixed tricycle undercarriage had rearward-sloping oleo legs mounted to the wings, giving a track of 2.40 m (7 ft 10 in).

The first flight of the L-17 was scheduled for May 1956.

Specifications

References

L-17
Low-wing aircraft
Single-engined tractor aircraft
Aircraft first flown in 1956
1950s civil trainer aircraft